Matteo Drudi (born 30 September 2000) is an Italian rugby union player, currently playing for Italian United Rugby Championship side Benetton. His preferred position is Prop.

He made his debut for Benetton in Round 12 of the 2021–22 United Rugby Championship against .

In 2019 and 2020, Drudi was named in the Italy Under 20 squad.

References

External links
itsrugby.co.uk Profile

2000 births
Living people
Italian rugby union players
Benetton Rugby players
Mogliano Rugby players
Rugby union props